Carl (Karl) August Wilhelm von Starck (27 September, 1867 in Kassel – 22 August, 1937) was a German lawyer and politician .

Karl was born in Kassel, the son of Wilhelm von Starck (1835–1913), a Hessian aristocrat and his wife Charlotte von Baumbach (1844–1914).

1867 births
1937 deaths
German politicians
Inter-Allied Rhineland High Commission